Shooting at the 2019 Pacific Games in Samoa was held from 15–19 July 2019 at the Tafaigata Shooting Range near Apia. Five disciplines were contested; three on the down-the-line shotgun range, and two at the indoor pistol range. Medals were awarded for both individual and team events in each discipline. The competition was not gender specific, with all events open to men and women.

Teams
The nations competing were:

Medal summary

Medal table

Pistol

Shotgun

References

External links
Results book

 

2019 Pacific Games
2019
Pacific Games